The 2007 WPA World Eight-ball Championship was an eight-ball world championship, organized by the World Pool-Billiard Association (WPA), and held 1–8 March 2007 at the Fujairah Exhibition Centre of the Al Diar Siji Hotel in Fujairah, United Arab Emirates. A total of 64 players competed in the tournament.

The event was won by Ronato Alcano, who defeated Dennis Orcollo in the final 11–8.

Tournament bracket

Preliminary round 
The following players won one match in the preliminary round, and finished between 33 and 48th

The following players did not win a round in the preliminary tournament, and were ranked 49th to 64th.

Finals

References

External links

Official World 8-ball Championship website

WPA World Eight-ball Championship
WPA World Eight-ball Championship
WPA World Eight-ball Championship
International sports competitions hosted by the United Arab Emirates